Lo Espejo is a commune of Chile located in Santiago Province, Santiago Metropolitan Region. It has the country's largest population density.

Demographics
The population fell by 6.1% (7,275 persons) between the 1990 and 1999 censuses. The 2006 population was projected at 106,819 persons, a 5.3% decline.

Stats
Average annual household income: US$23,881 (PPP, 2006)
Population below poverty line: 20.1% (2006)
Regional quality of life index: 71.90, mid-low, 36 out of 52 (2005)
Human Development Index: 0.657, 226 out of 341 (2003)

Administration
As a commune, Lo Espejo is a third-level administrative division of Chile administered by a municipal council, headed by an alcalde who is directly elected every four years. The 2021-2024 alcaldesa is Javiera Reyes Jara (PC). The communal council has the following members:
 Lorena Galleguillos Oliva
 Javiera López Layana
 Francisca Ganga Zúñiga
 Sandrino Salinas Cortés
 Carolina Mena Muñoz
 Carolina Sagredo Ugarte
 Roberto Canales Muñoz
 Luis Salinas Matalón

Within the electoral divisions of Chile, Lo Espejo is represented in the Chamber of Deputies by Pedro Browne (RN) and Guillermo Teillier (PC) as part of the 28th electoral district (together with Pedro Aguirre Cerda and San Miguel). The commune is represented in the Senate by Soledad Alvear (PDC) and Pablo Longueira (UDI) as part of the 8th senatorial constituency (Santiago-East).

References

External links

  Municipality of Lo Espejo

Populated places in Santiago Province, Chile
Communes of Chile
Geography of Santiago, Chile